Ivinhema Futebol Clube, commonly known as Ivinhema, is a Brazilian football team based in Ivinhema, Mato Grosso do Sul. They won the Campeonato Sul-Mato-Grossense once and competed in the Copa do Brasil twice.

History
The club was founded on January 1, 2006. Ivinhema won the Campeonato Sul-Mato-Grossense in 2008. They competed in the Copa do Brasil in 2009, when they were eliminated in the First Stage by Flamengo, and in 2010, when they were eliminated in the First Stage by Náutico.

Achievements

 Campeonato Sul-Mato-Grossense:
 Winners (1): 2008

Stadium
Ivinhema Futebol Clube play their home games at Estádio Luís Saraiva Vieira, nicknamed Saraivão. The stadium has a maximum capacity of 5,000 people.

References

Association football clubs established in 2006
Football clubs in Mato Grosso do Sul
2006 establishments in Brazil